Sibi Tehsil is a subdivision (tehsil) of Sibi District in the Balochistan province of Pakistan. The Sibi Tehsil consists of 6 circles Sangan, Sibi, Talli, Kurak, Khajjak and Mal.

History
During British rule the tehsil of Sibi was created, the population in 1891 was 7,125 which increased to 20,526 in 1901. At time the tehsil contained one town, Sibi, and 32 villages.

References

Sibi District
Tehsils of Balochistan, Pakistan